Ugonna Kingsley Onyenso  (born 25 September 2004) is a Nigerian college basketball player who plays for the Kentucky Wildcats. He also plays for the Nigeria national team, where he is the youngest player to ever play for the team at age 17. Standing at 7 ft 0 in (2.13 m) with a wing span of 7 ft 5 in (2.26 m), he plays as center.

Early career 
Born in Owerri, Kingsley played football as a kid before a local coach proposed playing basketball to him. Kingsley was a student-athlete at the NBA Academy Africa in Thiès, Senegal, where he played for three years. He then moved to the United States to play for the Putnam Science Academy in Putnam, Connecticut. In August 2021, he also played for Team England of the Amateur Athletic Union (AAU). He played in the 2022 NBA Academy Games and averaged 13.2 points, 9.2 rebounds and 2.7 blocks per game.

College career 
On August 2, 2022, Kingsley committed to Kentucky, choosing them over Kansas, Memphis and Oklahoma.

National team career 
In November 2021, Kingsley was selected for the Nigeria national senior team by coach Julius Nwosu. In his debut, he scored 10 points, four rebounds and two blocks in 16 minutes against Uganda. At age 17, he became the youngest player in history to play for the Nigerian national team.

References

Living people
2004 births
Nigerian men's basketball players
Nigerian expatriate basketball people in the United States
Centers (basketball)
People from Owerri